Riders of the Night is a 1918 American silent drama film directed by John H. Collins and starred his wife Viola Dana. It was produced and distributed by the Metro Pictures company.

A print is held at EYE Institute, Amsterdam aka Filmmuseum Amsterdam.

Plot
As described in a film magazine, Sally Castleton (Dana) is loved by Milt Derr (Chesebro), but Jed (Blue), a cousin of Milt, is desirous of possessing Sally. He makes several attempts to win Sally, but is repulsed each time. The night riders assemble against the gate keeper, who charges the villagers an excess toll. Two persons are killed, and Jed tells Sally that Milt is held and that the only way to free him is for Sally to marry Jed. Before he can extract a promise, he is killed. Sally, found departing from the Derr home by the chimney, is held for the murder. A few moments before she is to be hanged, Milt finds the true murderer. There is a happy ending for their romance.

Cast
Viola Dana as Sally Castleton
George Chesebro as Milt Derr
Clifford Bruce as John Derr
Russell Simpson as Sally's Grandfather
Mabel Van Buren as Sally's Aunt
Monte Blue as Jed, 'The Killer'

Reception
Like many American films of the time, Riders of the Night was subject to cuts by city and state film censorship boards. For example, the Chicago Board of Censors required cuts, in Reel 3, of a closeup of a $50 bill, Reel 5, five scenes of testing of scaffold rope, vision of man shooting in silhouette, all but the first scene of officer pulling Sally away from bars to include closeup of hands, forcing her up scaffold stairs, three scenes of her on scaffold with hood over head to where lover appears.

References

External links

1918 films
American silent feature films
1918 drama films
American black-and-white films
Silent American drama films
Films directed by John H. Collins
1910s American films
1910s English-language films